Puncha ratzeburgi is a species of snakefly in the monotypic genus  Puncha belonging to the family Raphidiidae.

Distribution and habitat
This species is widely distributed in Central and Eastern Europe (Austria, Bulgaria, Croatia, Czech Republic, France, Germany, Hungary, Italy, Slovakia, Slovenia and Switzerland). Isolated populations have been found from southern France, the Apennine and Balkan Peninsula.

Description
These snakeflies have long prothorax, hyaline wings with characteristic veination, a distinct pterostigma ranging from yellow-ocher to ocher-brown and a long ovipositor in the females.

Biology
They are predatory, both as adults and larvae.

Gallery

References

E. Haring Molecular phylogeny of the Raphidiidae (Raphidioptera)

External links
April Design
 Le Monde des Insectes

Raphidioptera
Insects described in 1876
Insects of Europe